Scissurella quadrata is a species of minute sea snail, a marine gastropod mollusk in the family Scissurellidae.

Description

Distribution
This marine species occurs off the Society Islands and Australia.

References

 Geiger D.L. & Jansen P. 2004. Revision of the Australian species of Anatomidae (Mollusca: Gastropoda: Vetigastropoda). Zootaxa 415 : 1–35
 Geiger D.L. (2012) Monograph of the little slit shells. Volume 1. Introduction, Scissurellidae. pp. 1–728. Volume 2. Anatomidae, Larocheidae, Depressizonidae, Sutilizonidae, Temnocinclidae. pp. 729–1291. Santa Barbara Museum of Natural History Monographs Number 7

Scissurellidae
Gastropods described in 2004